The HIPAS (HIgh Power Auroral Stimulation) Observatory was a research facility, built to study the ionosphere and its influence on radio communications. It was located 25 miles east of Fairbanks, Alaska in the Fairbanks North Star Borough area.

It was operated by the UCLA plasma physics laboratory from 1986 through 2007. A unique capability at that time, it could radiate 70 MW ERP at either 2.85 MHz or 4.53 MHz. These frequencies are close to a multiple of 2 and 3 of the electron gyro-frequency at ionospheric altitudes. Sending a pulse of HF-radio waves upward could accelerate the electrons in the ionosphere. Somewhat like waves on the ocean, the character of the ionosphere could be inferred from the backscatter signal. Other experiments attempted to combine RF and visible excitation where the latter probed metal ions such as sodium.

The HIPAS facility also used a LIDAR (LIght Detection And Ranging) instrument. Other projects included:
 A plasma torch, used for experiments in hazardous waste disposal
 A 2.8-meter liquid-mirror telescope, which uses a spinning bowl of mercury to form the mirror, used for laser experiments.
 An array of antennae, which are used for exciting the ionosphere.

The High Frequency Active Auroral Research Program (HAARP) is a similar facility funded jointly by the US Air Force and US Navy.

The HIPAS facility was shut down and much of the equipment sold as surplus in the Spring of 2010.

See also
 Other Alaskan astronomical research stations: HAARP, Poker Flat Research Range
 List of observatories

References

External links
 UCLA HIPAS Observatory 
 UCLA Department of Physics & Astronomy

Astronomical observatories in Alaska
Buildings and structures in Fairbanks North Star Borough, Alaska
Science and technology in Alaska
2010 disestablishments in Alaska